ASEP may mean:

 Asep, a male given name from Sundanese
 American Society of Exercise Physiologists
 Asymmetric simple exclusion process, in statistical physics
 Australasian Society for Experimental Psychology
 Association of Structural Engineers of the Philippines, Inc
 Supreme Council for Personnel Selection (Anótato Symvoúlio Epilogís Prosopikoú ), an independent commission tasked with the selection of personnel for work for the Greek public sector